Alán Kevin Méndez Olivera (born 10 January 1996) is a Uruguayan professional footballer who plays as a forward for Uruguayan Primera División club Peñarol.

Club career
Méndez is a former youth academy player of Peñarol. In January 2015, he signed a four-year contract with Roma and was immediately loaned out to Perugia.

On 12 July 2022, Méndez joined Peñarol on a contract until December 2023.

References

External links
 
 Kevin Méndez at AUF 

1996 births
People from Trinidad, Uruguay
Living people
Association football forwards
Uruguayan footballers
Uruguay youth international footballers
Uruguay under-20 international footballers
Peñarol players
A.C. Perugia Calcio players
FC Lausanne-Sport players
U.S. Viterbese 1908 players
FC Karpaty Lviv players
Defensor Sporting players
Swiss Challenge League players
Swiss Super League players
Serie C players
Ukrainian Premier League players
Uruguayan expatriate footballers
Uruguayan expatriate sportspeople in Italy
Uruguayan expatriate sportspeople in Switzerland
Uruguayan expatriate sportspeople in Ukraine
Expatriate footballers in Italy
Expatriate footballers in Switzerland
Expatriate footballers in Ukraine